Slepe is a hamlet in the county of Dorset, England. It is located on the A35 east of Organford.

References 

Hamlets in Dorset
Purbeck District